Crazy Rich Asians is a 2013 romantic comedy novel by Kevin Kwan.

Crazy Rich Asians may also refer to:

 Crazy Rich Asians (franchise), fictional universe created by Kevin Kwan in the eponymous first work, a 2013 novel
 Crazy Rich Asians (film), 2018 film directed by Jon M. Chu
 Crazy Rich Asians (soundtrack), 2018 film soundtrack album and film score album by Brian Tyler